Kirkby Malham is a small village and civil parish in the Craven district of  North Yorkshire, England. The population of the civil parish as taken in the 2011 Census (including Hanlith and Scosthrop) was 202. Nearby settlements include Hanlith, Malham, Airton and Calton.

American writer Bill Bryson once resided in the village.

It has a joint parish council, Kirkby Malhamdale Parish Council, with the parishes of Malham, Malham Moor and Hanlith.

See also
St Michael's Church, Kirkby Malham

References

External links

Village and area web site
Kirkby Malham history pages

Villages in North Yorkshire
Civil parishes in North Yorkshire